Barry Leon is a former Commercial Court Judge of the Eastern Caribbean Supreme Court based in the British Virgin Islands.  He was appointed in 2015 to succeed Edward Bannister, QC upon his retirement.  He was the first ever Canadian to hold the post.  Prior to his appointment he was a lawyer practising in Canada where he was a partner and head of the international arbitration group at Perley-Robertson, Hill and McDougall. Since retiring as a judge in 2018 Mr Leon has practised as an arbitrator and mediator.

Offices

References

British Virgin Islands judges
Living people
University of Toronto Faculty of Law alumni
University of Western Ontario alumni
University of Alberta alumni
Eastern Caribbean Supreme Court justices
British extraterritorial judges
Canadian judges of international courts and tribunals
Year of birth missing (living people)